Carpenter Mountain is a mountain located in Linn County, Oregon in the Willamette National Forest. It is part of the Cascade Range, and is one of the highest and easternmost peaks of the low-lying Western Cascades. A fire lookout on the summit was built in 1934 and has been recently reactivated for use. It marks the northernmost point in the H.J. Andrews Experimental Forest.

Route
Due to its remoteness and rough road conditions, the summit is relatively inaccessible compared to most other area mountains with a maintained trail and is mostly hiked by researchers resident in the Experimental Forest or hikers familiar with the region. The trailhead is located on a Forest Service road near an overlook. The trail is approximately 1 mile long with an elevation gain of 1,000 feet. It is heavily used by ecology researchers, and temperature sensors and blazes for bushwhacked routes are visible from the trail. Although the route is short, reaching the summit requires a short rock scramble that is doable without any equipment.

Summit
There is a historic fire lookout which occupies much of the summit. The summit, a large basaltic block, is an ancient volcanic plug. From the lookout, there are views of the Three Sisters, Mount Washington, Three Fingered Jack, Mount Jefferson and much of the central Oregon Cascades. On clear days, it is possible to see Mount Hood.

References

External links
 Information from TravelOregon.com

Cascade Range
Mountains of Linn County, Oregon
Mountains of Oregon
Willamette National Forest